The Região das Hortênsias, in English "Hydrangea Flower Region", is a tourist destination in the Serra Gaúcha region of the state of Rio Grande do Sul, Brazil. The cities in this region are: Nova Petrópolis, Gramado, Canela and São Francisco de Paula.

The Região das Hortênsias was created in 1989 to foment tourism in the area; However, the Região das Hortênsias is officially a "sindicato" or union established to help business development in the hospitality sector throughout the region.

Some in the region still speak German or the Brazilian variation of the German Hunsrückisch dialect called Riograndenser Hunsrückisch.

External links 
Região das Hortênsias website (in Portuguese)

Geography of Rio Grande do Sul